Love Arcade was an American alternative/powerpop band founded by Christian Berishaj. Their debut album, Love Arcade was released in 2006.

History
Berishaj received a guitar from his father in fourth grade. Berishaj started working on Pro Tools at the age of twelve. He began writing songs which he recorded at home. He also learned how to play other instruments and began holding neighborhood garage performances with a band, Snowhite, he formed with bass guitarist Seth Anderson, drummer Samuel Anderson and guitarist Tony Sliwinski. Berishaj had taught Seth how to play the bass guitar. Eventually, he began mailing demos and performance videos to record labels, having his mother cold call A&R representatives. By eighteen, Berishaj had written and recorded a whole album, Love Arcade, on which he plays all the instruments.

He secured a recording contract with Atlantic Records, after turning down an offer from Sony Records, along with his band in 2005. His demos had impressed David Wimmer and Leslie Dweck of Atalantic, who were taken by Berishaj's drive and ambition. Six months later, Samuel and Sliwinski were replaced by Dorman Pantfoeder and Thomas Amason from Jacksonville, Florida at the advice of Wimmer. A keyboardist, Nathaniel Boone was added later. Love Arcade was released in 2006 with the band credited as Love Arcade. After three years together, the band broke up.

Artistry
Berishaj wrote and performed all the songs on Love Arcade while the other members served as the touring band only, not performing on the record.

Members

Former
Christian Berishaj
Seth Anderson - bass guitar
Samuel Anderson - drums
Tony Sliwinski - guitar
Dorman Pantfoeder - drums
Thomas Amason - guitar
Nathaniel Boone - keyboards

Discography

Studio albums
2006 Love Arcade

References

External links
Love Arcade's Atlantic Records page

American power pop groups
Atlantic Records artists
Musical groups from Michigan
2005 establishments in Michigan